Fritz Hauser is a Swiss musician and composer from Basel, Switzerland.

Principal compositions 

On Time and Space (for 50 cymbals)
Die Klippe (for marimba and 3 cymbals)
Der Pendler (for drum kit)
Le souvenir (for 4 snare drums, 2 triangles, bass drum and sports bag)
Musique pour les bains thermaux de Vals (Grisons) (musical stones)

Discography

With Joe McPhee
Linear B (Hat Hut, 1990)

References

External links 
 Personal site

Swiss percussionists
Swiss composers
Swiss male composers
Musicians from Basel-Stadt
Swiss drummers
Male drummers
Living people
Year of birth missing (living people)